Diet Lime Coke was introduced to the market in 2004 with Coca-Cola with Lime and is still sold in North America to this day.

Diet Coke with Lime was discontinued in the UK as was Diet Coke with Lemon in early 2007, having been renamed Diet Coke with Citrus Zest in 2007, which is mixture of lime and lemon taste.  In 2009, Coca-Cola Freestyle machines began carrying Coca-Cola with Lime, along with its Diet counterpart.  The regular version has since been discontinued, but the Diet version continued with steady sales until 2018. The diet version continues to be popular in Canada, but is now discontinued and replaced with Diet Coke Ginger Lime in the United States.

In 2020, it returned in the UK as "Sublime Lime".

References

External links 

 Coca-Cola TV advertisements
 "Coke, You Nut" Information and Credits

Coca-Cola brands
Discontinued soft drinks
Food and drink introduced in 2005
Limes (fruit)
Citrus sodas

es:Coca-Cola con lima